Yakshi Paaru is a 1979 Indian Malayalam film,  directed by K. G. Rajasekharan and produced by Evershine. The film stars Sheela, M. G. Soman, Kaviyoor Ponnamma and Hari in the lead roles. The film has musical score by M. K. Arjunan.

Cast

Sheela as Paru
M. G. Soman as Rajan
Kaviyoor Ponnamma as Wife of Thampi
Hari
Jose Prakash as Thampi
Manavalan Joseph as Forest Guard
Ambika
Balan K. Nair as Irumban
Janardanan as Shekharan
K. P. Ummer
Kunchan
Kuthiravattam Pappu as Forest Guard
Roja Ramani

Soundtrack
The music was composed by M. K. Arjunan and the lyrics were written by Pappanamkodu Lakshmanan and Chirayinkeezhu Ramakrishnan Nair.

References

External links
 

1979 films
1970s Malayalam-language films
Films directed by K. G. Rajasekharan